Chahar or Qahar Right Front Banner (Цахар баруун гарын өмнөд хошуу; Čaqar Baraɣun Ɣarun Emünedü qosiɣu) is a Banner of Inner Mongolia, People's Republic of China, surrounding Jining District and bordering Xinghe County to the east, Fengzhen City to the south, Zhuozi County to the west, and Chahar Right Back Banner to the north. Its territory includes Lake Huangqi. It is under the administration of Ulaan Chab City. Its most important settlement is Tuguiwula, where Tuguiwula railway station is located.

Climate

References

www.xzqh.org 

 
Banners of Inner Mongolia
Ulanqab